Francesco Del Balzo may refer to:

 Francesco del Balzo, 1st Duke of Andria, Duke of Andria, Count of Montescaglioso and Squillace, and Lord of Berre, Mison, and Tiano
 Francesco II Del Balzo, southern Italian nobleman